Zhongyuan University of Technology (Simplified Chinese: 中原工学院 Zhōngyuán gōng xuéyuàn), formerly Zhengzhou Textile Institute (郑州纺织学院 Zhèngzhōu fǎngzhī xuéyuàn), is a public university in Zhengzhou, Henan province, China. It has three campuses: central, south, and west.

ZYUT has 17 schools and departments, which offer undergraduate and graduate programs in a range of fields including mechanical engineering, electronic information, civil engineering, architecture, material science and engineering, economics and management, law, and humanities.

It has 12,000 students and 565 faculty members.

History
The university was founded in 1955 under the name Zhengzhou Textile Institute. In time, it added more departments and changed its name in the 1990s.

External links
Official page

Zhongyuan University of Technology
Universities and colleges in Henan
Universities and colleges in Zhengzhou
Educational institutions established in 1955
1955 establishments in China